Alberto Aparicio (born 11 November 1923, date of death unknown) was a Bolivian footballer who played as a midfielder for Bolivia in the 1950 FIFA World Cup. He also played for Ferroviario La Paz. Aparicio is deceased.

References

1923 births
Year of death missing
Footballers from La Paz
Bolivian footballers
Bolivia international footballers
Association football midfielders
1950 FIFA World Cup players